Brent White is an American film editor with credits on feature films dating from 1993. White has worked on comedy films produced by Judd Apatow, and directed by Apatow, Adam McKay or Paul Feig.

Editing techniques 
White's work as an editor on the films directed by Apatow and McKay is unusual because of the importance of the actors' improvisations. Eric Melin's review of the film Talladega Nights (2006) focuses on this aspect of White's editing, the MVP of the movie is most definitely editor Brent White. Just as he did with 2004's Anchorman: The Legend of Ron Burgundy, White had to choose the best scenes from hours and hours of wildly different takes to fashion together something with a narrative arc that resembles a movie. It can't be easy work, but he had a little more story to work with than he did in the uneven Anchorman. Minor continuity errors be damned, Talladega Nights is one funny film.

The editing of Knocked Up (2007) was described in a feature article by Stephen Rodrick in The New York Times. Rodrick emphasizes the many different versions of the film that were created before deciding on the version that was released, "By the end of last month, when the final edit was done, I had seen five or six versions of Knocked Up. While the arc of the film remained the same, seemingly every line had been traded in and out".

Personal life 
White received his bachelor's degree in film production from the BYU College of Fine Arts and Communications (Brigham Young University) in 1983. White is married and has four children. He lives in the Los Angeles area.

Selected filmography
  Last Christmas (2019)
 Booksmart (2019)
 A Simple Favor (2018)
 Ghostbusters (2016)
 Spy (2015)
 Anchorman 2: The Legend Continues (2013)
 The Heat (2013)
 This is 40 (2012) 
 Arthur (2011)
 The Other Guys (2010)
 Funny People (2009)
 Step Brothers (2008)
 Knocked Up (2007)
 Talladega Nights: The Ballad of Ricky Bobby (2006)
 The 40-Year-Old Virgin (2005)
 Wake Up, Ron Burgundy: The Lost Movie (2004)
 Anchorman: The Legend of Ron Burgundy (2004)
 The Slaughter Rule (2002)
 Panic (2000)
 Wildflowers (1999)
 Matilda (1996)
 Teenage Bonnie and Klepto Clyde (1993)

References

Further reading
 Feature story about White.

External links

American film editors
Brigham Young University alumni
Year of birth missing (living people)
Living people